is a Japanese singer and actor. He is a vocalist of the J-pop dance and vocal group Sandaime J Soul Brothers from Exile Tribe. He joined the group after winning the Vocal Battle Audition 2, alongside Hiroomi Tosaka. As a member of Sandaime J Soul Brothers, he has received the Japan Record Awards twice. Since 2014, he has become the Thursday host for J-Wave's "Spark".

The first solo single was released in January 2018 with the digital single "One Day", while remaining a member of Sandaime J Soul Brothers. For his solo activities he uses his birth name stylized as RYUJI IMAICHI.

He debuted as an actor in 2019 in the short film On The Way of the drama anthology Sono Shunkan, Boku wa Nakitaku Natta -Cinema Fighters project-.

Early life
Ryuji Imaichi was born on September 2, 1986, in Kyoto Prefecture, Japan, but was raised in Kawasaki, Kanagawa Prefecture. He played baseball in elementary school and junior high school as a pitcher. According to himself, he was a rebellious teenager and dropped out of high school at the age of 16. He then started to do different part-time jobs, including dish washing at a ramen shop, and spent his wages playing with the pachinko and slot machines in his free time. After a year and a half, one of his friends, a construction worker in the neighboring city, invited Imaichi to work together at his company and become a construction worker too. Imaichi chose to specialize in pressure welding since the job paid a higher salary than for a normal construction worker. He achieved to earn all the required licenses to become a welder.

Imaichi became a big fan of Atsushi as early as 2000 when he saw him taking part in the Asayan talent search TV show. When Atsushi debuted as the vocalist of Exile later on, Imaichi quickly became a big fan of the group and learned to sing their songs. However, he did not initially have the dream of becoming a singer. In 2006, his then girlfriend encouraged him to participate in the Vocal Battle Audition 2006: Asian Dream, an audition to find a new vocalist for Exile. He passed the first round without much preparation but failed to pass the second round. Despite his loss, he became serious about pursuing a career as a singer, and he was determined to get revenge for his failure. From that point on he started attending vocal training lessons at the Vocal Academy of Tokyo at nights, after a full day of work as a construction worker.

In 2009, he won runner up Grand Prix in the artist category of the avex WORLD AUDITION 2008, and started being enrolled in the Avex Artist Academy as a scholarship student. From 2006 to 2010, he took part in more than 100 different auditions.

Career 
In February 2010, Imaichi participated in the Vocal Battle Audition 2: ~Yume o Motta Wakamono-tachi e~. As he turned 24 that year, he considered this chance as the last try for his dream to become a professional singer. He passed the first round and met Hiroomi Tosaka in the second round, and they both considered each other to be strong competitors after seeing their performances for the first round on Shûkan Exile's coverage of the audition. As Imaichi and Tosaka both were selected as two of the ten finalists after the third round, it was announced that the two winners of Vocal Battle Audition 2 would become the vocalists of the new dance and vocal group Sandaime J Soul Brothers. On September 15, 2010, the final round of the audition was held at Akasaka Blitz music venue and Imaichi won the audition alongside Hiroomi Tosaka. The two officially became the vocalists of Sandaime J Soul Brothers. A few days later, as they finished recording Sandaime's first single, the seven members of the group met each other for the first time. On September 27, Imaichi and Tosaka made their first public appearance as singers during the Fantasy Goya-sai: Exile Tamashī (FANTASY後夜祭～EXILE魂～; FANTASY Late Night Festival ~EXILE Soul~) live performance from Exile at Toyota Stadium. On November 10, Sandaime J Soul Brothers with the single "Best Friend's Girl".

In February and March 2012, Tosaka participated in VBA Live Tour 2012 Vocal Battle Stage held in Tokyo and Osaka, alongside other LDH's vocalists who have participated in Vocal Battle Audition.  From November 2012 to March,2013, Imaichi appeared in TBS's music variety show EX-LOUNGE. In 2013, he sang the national anthem of Japan on the stage of the IBF World Boxing Championship held in Kagawa Prefecture.

In 2014, Imaichi composed the lyrics for Sandaime J Soul Brothers' song "PRIDE", which was his first attempt at lyric composition. Since October 2014, he has become the Thursday host for J−WAVE's "SPARK". On the radio, Imaichi shares the songs and musicians that he loves with his listeners, and he introduced Brian McKnight on his very first broadcast.

In 2015, he released his first solo song "All LOVE" as part of Sandaime J Soul Brothers' album PLANET SEVEN under the name of the group. Furthermore, he was featured on DANCE EARTH PARTY's cover of "Beautiful Name" originally by Godiego, which was released on August 5. He also featured on Crystal Kay's Japanese cover of "Very Special" by Debra Laws.

In 2016, Sandaime J Soul Brothers released a documentary about themselves, Born in the EXILE. The theme song of the documentary had the same title as the film and Ryuji Imaichi and Hiroomi Tosaka composed the lyrics of the song together to express the "soul" of the group. In the same year, Imaichi also released his first solo song under his own name titled "Forever Young At Heart" in HiGH & LOW ORIGINAL BEST ALBUM, and the song was used as part of the soundtrack for the TV shows and films of the High & Low franchise, an action and music franchise produced by LDH.

In September 2017, as Sandaime J Soul Brothers' member Kenjiro Yamashita starred in dTV×FOD's romance drama Love or Not, Imaichi was appointed as the host of a music television program titled Love or Not♪, which was part of the Love or Not project. The show ended in February 2018.

On January 12, 2018, while remaining a member of Sandaime J Soul Brothers, Imaichi made his solo debut with the digital single "ONE DAY". The single immediately took first place on Oricon's weekly digital single chart. He continued to release more digital singles throughout the year, such as "Angel" on February 16, "Thank you" on March 16 and "Alter Ego" on April 20. He also befriended his longtime idol Brian Mcknight, and the two collaborated to produce Imaichi's song "Thank you" when Imaichi stayed at Mcknight's home. Furthermore, Imaichi released his first photo essay titled TIMELESS TIME on March 26, which was produced by American Artist Daniel Arsham. After releasing his first solo album LIGHT>DARKNESS on August 1, he concluded his solo activities in 2018 by going on his first tour titled Ryuji Imaichi Live Tour 2018 "Light>Darkness"  from August 11 to December 24. Brian Mcknight took part in Imaichi's show in Saitama Super Arena as a guest star, and the two performed Brian McKnight's "Back At One" together.

Prior to the release of the live footage from his first solo tour on March 6, 2019, Imaichi released his 5th digital single "Yoake Mae / Kore ga Unmei Nara" (夜明け前 / これが運命なら; Before Dawn / If This is Destiny) on February 15. Furthermore, he made his acting debut in fall 2019 in the short film Uta Monogatari -CINEMA FIGHTERS project-. It was also announced that he would release his first physical single "RILY" on October 30. Furthermore, he appeared on the cover of anan's issue 2175 at the end of the year, making it first solo magazine cover in his career.

On January 15, 2020, Imaichi released his second studio album ZONE OF GOLD.  In January and February, Imaichi and Hiroomi Tosaka held their first joint dome tour titled LDH PERFECT YEAR 2020 SPECIAL SHOWCASE RYUJI IMAICHI / HIROOMI TOSAKA. In January, Imaichi was also appointed as the 30th-anniversary ambassador of Jalan magazine, one of Japan's largest travel magazines. On July 1, the live footage of the joint tour, LDH PERFECT YEAR 2020 SPECIAL SHOWCASE RYUJI IMAICHI / HIROOMI TOSAKA, was released and was ranked No.1 on Oricon's weekly DVD, BD and joint DVD/BD ranking at the same time with about 50.547 copies sold in the first week.

Personal life 
Imaichi has a brother and a sister.

He has been a fan of  Atsushi since he was a teenager, and is a big fan of Brian Mcknight. Both artists deeply influenced his music style. He is often compared to Atsushi, for his resemblance to him while wearing sunglasses.

As a baseball lover, he built up a baseball team called NAKAMEGURO RYUJI 'S inside LDH, with the company's staff members and artists as its players and himself as the coach.

Discography

Studio albums

Singles

Digital singles

Other Solo Songs

Participating works

Video releases

Lyrics

Tie-ups

Filmography

TV programmes

TV Dramas

Short film

Advertisements

Radio series

Radio shows

Bibliography

Photo essays

Tours 
Ryuji Imaichi Live Tour 2018 "Light>Darkness" (2018)

LDH Perfect Year 2020 Special Showcase Ryuji Imaichi / Hiroomi Tosaka(2020)

References

External links
  at LDH Japan
  at Sandaime J Soul Brothers Official Website 
  at Avex(in Japanese)
 
 

1986 births
Living people
People from Kyoto Prefecture
Musicians from Kyoto Prefecture
LDH (company) artists
21st-century Japanese singers
21st-century Japanese male singers